St Vincent’s Magdalene laundry was based within Cork in which was run by the Religious Sisters of Charity.

History 
Beside St Vincent’s laundry is a secondary school also called St Vincent’s in which was also run by the religious sisters of Charity. Children of women who were “inmates” to the laundries attended the school next door to where their mother was being held as slave.

Criticism 
The last Magdalene Laundry closed on the 25th September, 1996.  Although St Vincent’s Magdalene Laundry closed down their operations of the laundry in 1991. In 1994 they changed the name of the institution to “St Vincent’s Care Home for those with intellectual disabilities”. Women who worked within the laundry, never got to leave the dorms, building or land, while it was still being run by the Religious Sister of Charity that was until standards fell so low reported in a HIQA report  HSE then had a month to up standards.  

Justice 4 All Women & Children in 2018 exposed to journalist Róisín Burke that women who was made inmates to the laundry still lived in the centre and never left. There was women there who knew child survivor Mary Teresa Collins who would visit the laundry to see her inmate mother Angela Collins.   In 2003, 2016, 2017, 2018 a woman called Elieen a “former Magdalene resident” who knew Mary’s mother and Mary as a child visitor was pictured beside child survivor Mary being in attendance at St Vincent’s Mass grave remembrance events in St. Finbarr's Cemetery in which is held by Justice 4 All Women & Children. Mary throughout the years would request permission from the Religious order for her mothers friends to be attendance and then in 2018 she had to obtain permission via HSE. 

In August 2020 it was reported that women who worked within St Vincent’s Magdalene Laundry was still living there.  The Magdalene apology was issued by the government to the surviving residents of the laundries in year 2013.

References 

History of Catholicism in Ireland
Catholic religious scandals
Scandals in Ireland
Companies based in Cork (city)